Luciana de Paula Mendes (born 26 July 1971 in Rio de Janeiro) is a retired Brazilian athlete who competed predominantly in the 400 and 800 metres. She represented her country at the 1996 and 2004 Summer Olympics reaching the semifinals on the second occasion. She also won multiple medals at the continental level.

Her 800 and 1000 metres personal bests are the current national records.

Competition record

Personal bests
400 metres – 52.76 (Manaus 2001)
600 metres – 1:25.05 (Liège 2004)
800 metres – 1:58.27 (Hechtel 1994)
1000 metres – 2:36.30 (Brussels 1995)
1500 metres – 4:20.81 (São Paulo 2003)

References

1971 births
Brazilian female middle-distance runners
Athletes from Rio de Janeiro (city)
Athletes (track and field) at the 1996 Summer Olympics
Athletes (track and field) at the 2004 Summer Olympics
Olympic athletes of Brazil
Living people
Pan American Games medalists in athletics (track and field)
Pan American Games silver medalists for Brazil
Athletes (track and field) at the 1995 Pan American Games
Athletes (track and field) at the 2003 Pan American Games
South American Games bronze medalists for Brazil
South American Games medalists in athletics
Competitors at the 1994 South American Games
Medalists at the 1995 Pan American Games
21st-century Brazilian women
20th-century Brazilian women